Jakkasamudram is a panchayat union in Palacode taluk, Dharmapuri district, Tamil Nadu.

References

Villages in Dharmapuri district